Jack Petersen may refer to:

 Jack Petersen (boxer)
 Jack Petersen (guitarist)

See also
 John Petersen (disambiguation)
 Jack Peterson (disambiguation)